Resen is a municipality in southwestern Republic of North Macedonia. Resen is also the name of the town where the municipal seat is found. Resen Municipality is located in the Pelagonia Statistical Region.

Geography
The municipality borders Ohrid Municipality to the west, Demir Hisar Municipality to the northeast, Bitola Municipality to the east, and Greece and Albania to the south.

Demographics

According to the last national census from 2021, Resen Municipality has 14,373 inhabitants.

Ethnic groups in the municipality include:

Mother tongues in the municipality include:
 Macedonian = 12,943 (76.9%)
 Albanian = 1,885 (11.2%)
 Turkish = 1,766 (10.5%)
 Roma = 113 (0.7%)
 others.

Religions in the municipality include:
 Orthodox = 12,599 (74.9%)
 Muslim = 3,927 (23.3%)
 others.

Orthodox Macedonians inhabit all settlements in the municipality of Resen, except Kozjak and Gorna Bela Crkva. During the late Ottoman period, Macedonian Muslims used to reside in Podmočani and Slivnica, although the villages are now wholly populated by Orthodox Macedonians.

In Resen, a sizable amount of the Orthodox Macedonian population originates from the villages of Podmočani, Bolno, Malovišta and other villages from the Lake Ohrid area who settled in Resen during the middle of the 19th century. Orthodox Aromanians livelive, in small numbers, in Resen and in the village of Jankovec.

Most of the Muslim population living in Resen, in addition to those living in Drmeni, Carev Dvor, Lavci, Kozjak and some families in Grnčari and Gorna Bela Crkva speaks Turkish. In the late Ottoman period, a few Turks used to also reside in the village of Nakolec. The Turkish population in the Prespa region is believed by scholars to either be descended from Turks settled in strategic areas or the descendants of local Turkified Slavs during Ottoman rule.

The presence of Muslim Albanians in the Lake Prespa region dates to the Ottoman period consisting of southern Albanians (Tosks) who arrived from various areas of southern Albania, while some families consider their presence in the Prespa region to be indigenous.

The speech and folklore of Prespa Albanians (Presparë) is similar to that of the Devoll and Korçë regions in Albania.

Albanian-speaking Muslims are located in small numbers in Kozjak, Sopotsko, Gorna Bela Crkva and in recent times in Podmočani while forming a significant part of the village population in Dolna Bela Crkva, Grnčari, Krani, Arvati, Asamati and Nakolec.

During the Ottoman period the now former village of Bukovo, a Macedonian settlement that later became populated only with Macedonian Muslims and Albanians became depopulated after they left the village during the Balkan Wars (1912-1913). Of settlements with Prespa Muslim Albanians most are Sunni, except in Gorna Bela Crkva. A small number of Bektashi Albanians, known locally as Kolonjarë (people of Kolonjë) who trace their arrival from the region of Kolonjë, southern Albania between the late 18th and early 19th century lived in Ljubojno, Nakolec and Krani.

After the fall of the Ottoman empire and some population movements Kolonjarë inhabit Gorna Bela Crkva, Dolna Bela Crkva and Asamati. The Albanian population in Resen settled there during the first decades of the 19th century originating from the Yanya vilayet. In contemporary times Muslim Albanians live in small numbers within Resen. A small number of Albanian speaking Muslim Romani used to live in Krani and Nakolec which during the latter decades of the 20th century have migrated to Ohrid and Resen.

Traditionally a class and religious divide existed between the Bektashi Kolonjarë who formed the local former ruling Ottoman elite or bejlerë and now contemporary Prespa Albanian intelligentsia and Sunni Albanians villagers, referred to by Kolonjarë as arbutë (peons, commoners) or të vêndë (locals).

Sunni Albanians from Sopotsko, Grnčari and Dolna Bela Crkva traditionally highlighted their religious identity over a linguistic one having closer economic and social relations with local Turks and Macedonian Muslims and being distant from Orthodox Macedonians. Differences between both Bektashi and Sunni Prespa Albanian communities over time have disappeared through intermarriage and closer communal and cultural relations. The local Prespa dialect of Tosk Albanian being on the periphery of Albanian speech has been strongly influenced by the Macedonian language resulting in the loss of vowel length and the phoneme h, while the alveolar trill (//) has merged into the alveolar tap ( //).

References

External links

 Official website

 
Pelagonia Statistical Region
Municipalities of North Macedonia